Chryseobacterium palustre is a bacterium. It is rod-shaped, non-motile, aerobic, catalase- and oxidase-positive and forms yellow colonies. Its type strain is 3A10(T) (=LMG 24685(T) =NBRC 104928(T)).

References

Further reading

Whitman, William B., et al., eds. Bergey's manual® of systematic bacteriology. Vol. 5. Springer, 2012.
Van Wyk, Esias Renier. Virulence Factors and Other Clinically Relevant Characteristics of Chryseobacterium Species. Diss. University of the Freee State, 2008.

External links 
LPSN

Type strain of Chryseobacterium palustre at BacDive -  the Bacterial Diversity Metadatabase

palustre
Bacteria described in 2010